Roderick "Ricky" McLean (born 8 November 1947) is a former Australian rules football player who played in the VFL between 1966 and 1971 for the Carlton Football Club and between 1972 and 1974 and again in 1976 for the Richmond Football Club. McLean coached Sunshine in the 1980 VFA season.

Family
He is the son of Carlton footballer Rod McLean.

Football

Richmond (VFL)
On 14 August 1976, playing for Richmond reserves against South Melbourne on the MCG, McLean was reported on six different charges; he was found guilty of all charges and was suspended for 16 weeks. He did not play VFL football again.

Footnotes

References
 
 Hogan P: The Tigers Of Old, Richmond FC, (Melbourne), 1996.

External links
 
 
 
 
 Ricky McLean, at Blueseum.

1947 births
Living people
Carlton Football Club players
Richmond Football Club players
Australian rules footballers from Victoria (Australia)
Sunshine Football Club (VFA) players
Sunshine Football Club (VFA) coaches